Charles Cuff (10 July 1877 – 30 June 1942) was a New Zealand cricketer. He played in two first-class matches for Canterbury in 1907/08.

See also
 List of Canterbury representative cricketers

References

External links
 

1877 births
1942 deaths
New Zealand cricketers
Canterbury cricketers
Cricketers from Christchurch